USS Edwards has been the name of more than one United States Navy ship, and may refer to:

USS Edwards sometimes can also be used to refer to various other United States Navy ships, including:

 , a Clemson-class destroyer in commission from 1920 to 1945
 USS Ray K. Edwards (DE-237), a  converted during construction into the high-speed transport 
 , also known as USS W. A. Edwards, a patrol vessel in commission from 1917 to 1919

United States Navy ship names